The title chief of staff (or head of staff) identifies the leader of a complex organization such as the armed forces, institution, or body of persons and it also may identify a principal staff officer (PSO), who is the coordinator of the supporting staff or a primary aide-de-camp to an important individual, such as a president, or a senior military officer, or leader of a large organization. 

In general, a chief of staff provides a buffer between a chief executive and that executive's direct-reporting team. The chief of staff generally works behind the scenes to solve problems, mediate disputes, and deal with issues before they are brought to the chief executive. Often chiefs of staff act as a confidant and advisor to the chief executive, acting as a sounding board for ideas. Ultimately the actual duties depend on the position and the people involved.

Civilian

Government

Brazil 
Chief of Staff of the Presidency

Canada 
Chief of Staff to the Prime Minister
Principal Secretary

India 

 Principal Secretary to the Prime Minister of India

Nigeria 
Chief of Staff to the President

Pakistan 
Principal Secretary to the President 
Principal Secretary to the Prime Minister

Philippines 
Chief of Staff (Philippines), a former position in the Cabinet of the Philippines, serving under the President of the Philippines

South Korea 
Chief Presidential Secretary, chief of staff to the President of South Korea

Spain 
Moncloa Chief of Staff

United Kingdom 
Private Secretary to the Sovereign
Downing Street Chief of Staff
Cabinet Secretary
Principal Private Secretary to the Prime Minister 
Principal Private Secretary to the Secretary of State for Foreign and Commonwealth Affairs

United States 

 Chief of staff, the most senior staff member in the office of a member of the United States Congress
White House Chief of Staff

Military
In general, the positions listed below are not "chiefs of staff" as defined at the top of this page; they are the heads of the various forces/commands and tend to have subordinates that fulfill the "chief of staff" roles.

In general
Chief of the Defence
Chief of the Defence Staff
Chief of the General Staff
Chief of the Army Staff
Chief of the Air Staff
Chief of the Naval Staff
:Category:Vice chiefs of staff

Azerbaijan
Chief of General Staff of Azerbaijani Armed Forces - head of General Staff of Azerbaijani Armed Forces

Canada
Chief of the Defence Staff (Canada)
Chief of the Air Staff (Canada)

France
Chief of the Defence Staff (French: , CEMA)
Chief of Staff of the French Air Force (French: , CEMAA)
Chief of Staff of the French Army (French: , CEMAT)
Chief of Staff of the French Navy (French: , CEMM)
Chief of Staff of the French Gendarmerie (French: , DGGN)

Ghana
Chief of Defence Staff
Chief of the Army Staff
Chief of the Navy Staff
Chief of the Air Staff

Greece
Chief of the Defence Staff (Greece)
Chief of Staff of the Hellenic Air Force 
Chief of Staff of the Hellenic Army 
Chief of Staff of the Hellenic Navy

India
Chief of Defence Staff (Indian Armed Forces)
Chief of the Army Staff (Indian Army)
Chief of the Naval Staff (Indian Navy)
Chief of the Air Staff (Indian Air Force)

Indonesia
Chief of Staff of the Indonesian Army
Chief of Staff of the Indonesian Navy
Chief of Staff of the Indonesian Air Force

Ireland
Chief of Staff of the Defence Forces

Israel
Chief of the Israeli General Staff

Italy
Chief of the Defence Staff
Chief of the Army Staff
Chief of the Navy Staff
Chief of the Air Force Staff

Pakistan
Chairman Joint Chiefs of Staff Committee
Chief of Army Staff
CGS
Chief of Naval Staff
Vice Chief of the Naval Staff
Chief of Air Staff (Pakistan)

Philippines
Chief of Staff, Armed Forces of the Philippines, later renamed to the Chairman of the Joint Chiefs, AFP - exercises command and control over all elements of the Armed Forces of the Philippines.

Portugal
 Chief of the General Staff of the Armed Forces (Portuguese: , CEMGFA) - operational commander of the Portuguese Armed Forces
 Chief of Staff of the Navy (Portuguese: , CEMA) - commander of the Portuguese Navy
 Chief of Staff of the Army (Portuguese: , CEME) - commander of the Portuguese Army
 Chief of Staff of the Air Force (Portuguese: , CEMFA) - commander of the Portuguese Air Force

Spain
 Chief of the Defence Staff
 Chief of Staff of the Army
 Chief of Staff of the Navy
 Chief of Staff of the Air Force

Sri Lanka
Chief of the Defence Staff (Sri Lanka) - the most senior appointment in the Sri Lankan Armed Forces. 
 Chief of Staff of the Army - deputy commander of the Sri Lankan Army
 Chief of Staff of the Navy - deputy commander of the Sri Lankan Navy
 Chief of Staff of the Air Force - deputy commander of the Sri Lankan Air Force

United Kingdom
Chief of the Defence Staff (CDS) - the professional head of the British Armed Forces. 
Chief of the Naval Staff, more commonly called the First Sea Lord
Chief of the General Staff, formerly the Chief of the Imperial General Staff
Chief of the Air Staff
The Sovereign is the Commander-in-Chief. The CDS heads the Chiefs of Staff Committee and is assisted by the Vice-Chief of the Defence Staff.

United States
 Joint Chiefs of Staff, headed by the Chairman of the Joint Chiefs of Staff (CJCS)
 Chief of Staff of the United States Army
 An Army general (O-10) serving as the senior ranking officer within the United States Army, but subordinate to any Army O-10 serving as CJCS or Vice CJCS    
 Chief of Staff of the United States Air Force
 An Air Force general (O-10) serving as the senior ranking officer within the United States Air Force, but subordinate to any USAF O-10 serving as CJCS or Vice CJCS 
 In unified combatant commands, headed by a general (O-10) or Navy admiral (O-10)
 A major general (O-8) or Navy or Coast Guard rear admiral (O-8) overseeing the command's directorates
 In military commands headed by a lieutenant general (O-9), vice admiral (O-9), major general (O-8) or rear admiral (O-8), or brigadier general (O-7) or rear admiral, lower half (O-7)
 A colonel (O-6) or Navy or Coast Guard captain (O-6) overseeing the entire general officer's/flag officer's command staff; in some cases may also be referred to as an executive assistant or executive officer
 In some commands and organizations, two officers in pay grade O-6 may be assigned as chief of staff and executive assistant, respectively.

See also
 Chief of Defence
 Chief Secretary (disambiguation)
 General secretary
Permanent secretary
 Principal Private Secretary
 Provincial secretary

References

External links